Mongeau is a French-language surname. It may refer to:

 Claude Mongeau, Canadian railroad executive
 France Mongeau (born 1961), Canadian educator and poet
 Michel Mongeau (1965–2010), Canadian ice hockey player
 Serge Mongeau (born 1937), Canadian physician, writer, publisher and politician
 Tana Mongeau (born 1998), American Internet personality and model